is a Japan-exclusive action video game released for the Game Boy in 1990.

Gameplay

Players must control a combat robot with the ultimate goal of destroying the enemy orb. Each level only has one screen to blast hostile robots, solve challenging platforms, and manipulate a series of short puzzles.

There are 30 stages with a boss battle on every tenth stage. A weapon is available; its gunfire can be altered by changing the angle of the gun. The distance of the shot can also be changed by holding down the button for extended periods of time. A two-player duel mode has been added, allowing players to fight either another player or the computer.

This game employs a third-person perspective with a side-view.

Reception

References

1990 video games
Action video games
Game Boy-only games
Japan-exclusive video games
Masaya Games games
Science fiction video games
Multiplayer and single-player video games
Game Boy games
Video games developed in Japan
Video games scored by Atsuhiro Motoyama